Sorkh Gazi may refer to:
 Sorkh Gazi, Khash
 Sorkh Gazi, Mehrestan